is Mami Kawada's third maxi single and it was released on May 9, 2007. Akai Namida was used as an insert song for the movie of Shakugan no Shana. This single reached #21 spot on the Oricon charts and has a total sales of 10,160 copies. It stayed in the weekly charts for four weeks.

The single will come in a limited CD+DVD edition (GNCA-0053) and a regular CD only edition (GNCA-0054). The DVD will contain the promotional video for Beehive.

Track listing 

 - 4:19
Composition by: Tomoyuki Nakazawa
Arrangement by: Tomoyuki Nakazawa
Lyrics: Mami Kawada
Beehive - 4:18
Composition by: Tomoyuki Nakazawa
Arrangement by: Tomoyuki Nakazawa, Takeshi Ozaki
Lyrics: Mami Kawada
 - 4:19
Beehive (instrumental) - 4:16

Charts and sales

References

2007 singles
2007 songs
Mami Kawada songs
Japanese film songs
Shakugan no Shana songs
Songs written for animated films
Songs with lyrics by Mami Kawada
Song recordings produced by I've Sound